is a town in Iwate Prefecture, Japan. , the town had an estimated population of 15,195 and a population density of 58 persons per km², in 6,554 households.

Geography
Yamada is located on the ria coastline of central Iwate Prefecture, facing the Pacific Ocean on the northern part of Funakoshi Bay and Yamada Bay. The Sekiguchi River and Ogasa River empty into Yamada Bay, and Yamada Port is located slightly south of the mouth of the Sekiguchi River, with train stations, government offices, hospitals, etc. concentrated in this vicinity. Parts of the town are within the borders of the Sanriku Fukkō National Park.

Neighbouring municipalities
Iwate Prefecture
Miyako
Ōtsuchi

Climate
Yamada has an oceanic climate (Köppen Cfb) characterized by mild summers and cold winters.  The average annual temperature in Yamada is 9.2 °C. The average annual rainfall is 1415 mm with September as the wettest month and February as the driest month. The temperatures are highest on average in August, at around 21.6 °C, and lowest in January, at around -1.8 °C.

Demographics
Per Japanese census data, the population of Yamada has declined over the past 60 years.

History
The area of present-day Yamada was part of ancient Mutsu Province, with many Jomon period and Kofun period remains. In the Heian period it was dominated by the Abe clan and the Northern Fujiwara. It was dominated by the Nanbu clan from the Kamakura period. It was part of Morioka Domain under the Tokugawa shogunate during the Edo period. Yamada was the location of the 1643 Breskens Incident, where the Dutch ship Breskens, part of the De Vries expedition, made two unauthorised visits to Yamada and was captured by Japanese authorities.

With the Meiji period establishment of the modern municipalities system, the town of Yamada was created within Higashihei District on April 1, 1889. Higashihei District was merged into Minamihei District on March 29, 1896. On March 1, 1955, Yamada annexed the neighboring villages of Funakoshi, Orikada, Osawa and Toyomane to reach is present borders.

After the March 2011 Tōhoku earthquake, it was reported that the town had been almost completely submerged by the ensuing tsunami.

Government
Yamada has a mayor-council form of government with a directly elected mayor and a unicameral town council of 14 members. Yamada, together with the city of Miyako, town of Iwaizumi and the villages of Fudai and Tanohata, collectively contributes three seats to the Iwate Prefectural legislature. In terms of national politics, the town is part of Iwate 2nd district of the lower house of the Diet of Japan.

Economy
The local economy is strongly based on commercial fishing. In the early 20th century, it was a noted whaling port.

Education
Yamada has nine public elementary schools and two public junior high schools operated by the town government, and one public high school operated by the Iwate Prefectural Board of Education.

Transportation

Railway
Sanriku Railway – Rias Line
  -  -  -

Highway

International relations
 – Zeist, Netherlands, friendship city since May 13, 2000

Notable people from Yamada
Zenkō Suzuki, former Prime Minister

References

External links

Official Website 

 
Towns in Iwate Prefecture
Populated coastal places in Japan